An Excellent Tragedy of Mulleasses the Turke, and Borgias Governour of Florence, commonly referred to as The Turk is Jacobean revenge tragedy by John Mason first published in 1610.

References

1610 plays